Beta-casein is a protein that in humans is encoded by the CSN2 gene. It is in the class of phosphoproteins and generally occurs in mammalian milk.

References

External links

Further reading